The Germiyanids ( or Germiyan Beyliği) was a prominent Anatolian beylik established by the Oghuz Turkish tribes (probably the Afshar tribe) after the decline of Sultanate of Rûm. However, while the beylik was always mentioned as Turkoman or Oghuz Turkish, the population consisted of Turks and Yezidi Kurds, brought by the Seljuks from the east of Malatya to western Anatolia as militia guards against the threatening Turkish tribesmen.

Origins
According to Agoston and Masters Germiyanoğulları were Turkomans who had immigrated to the west because of Mongol pressure in the second half of the 13th century. The Germiyanids were of Afshar branch of Oghuz Turks. Germiyanids likely came from Kerman or Fars Province, perhaps headed west with Khwarazmshahs. After the death of Jalal ad-Din Mingburnu, they remailed in Malatya area for a while, then moved to Kütahya, where they established the beylik.

According to Middle East historian Petry, the Germiyans were a Turco-Kurdish dynasty. However, cultural historian Cemal Kafadar states the ethnic make up of the dynasty is too complex for a simple straightforward interpretation.

History
For a brief period in the second half of the 14th century, Germiyan Dynasty was second only to Karamanid Dynasty in its rising power. But they were later taken over by the neighboring Osmanoğlu dynasty, who were to found the Ottoman Empire later.

Germiyans played a crucial role in settling Turkish populations along the coastal regions of the Aegean Sea, the founders of the Beyliks of Aydin, Sarukhan, İnançoğlu and Menteşe having started out as Germiyan commanders.

They rebelled against the central power in 1283, upon the execution of the sultan Kaykhusraw III by the Mongols, and placing of Mesud II on the Seljuq throne. The struggle between combined Mongol-Seljuq forces based in Konya and the rebel forces of Germiyan continued until 1290. An agreement could only be reached in 1299, upon which the Germiyan Dynasty also entered into possession of Ankara. When the Ilkhanid governor Emir Çoban took over Anatolia in 1314, they declared allegiance and concentrated on raids towards the regions to their west.

Their western offshoots that were the Beyliks of Menteşe, Aydin, Ladik, Sarukhan and Karasi were all subject to the Germiyan in the early periods of their foundation, while the Beyliks of Sâhib Ata and Hamidids to the south had to rely on them for protection against attacks from the Karamanids. As for the northern regions of Anatolia, Byzantine sources record Umur Bey, a commander and son-in-law to the Germiyan family, to be the possessor of Paphlagonia, where Jandarid dynasty was to rule only after Germiyan power weakened.

Their strong political entity was eventually surrounded by newer states established by their own former commanders, leaving the Germiyan no outlet to the coastline or to Byzantine territory. Their powerful Karamanid neighbors exerting constant pressure from the east, Germiyan gradually fell under the rising influence of the Ottomans. Bayezid I married with Sultan Hatun, a Germiyanid princess, and acquired the eastern portion of Germiyan as a concession in order to border the Ottoman rival, the Karamanids.

Legacy

The actual Turkish province of Kütahya was called the sub-province (sanjak) and later province (vilayet) of Germiyan until the early years of the Republic of Turkey, when it was renamed after its central town.

The founding dynasty of the beylik produced illustrious descendants either under the Ottoman Empire or in present-day Turkey, a notable one among these being the 19th century grand vizier Abdurrahman Nureddin Pasha.

The Egyptian National Library and Archives keeps a copy of Qabus-Nama in Old Anatolian Turkish, written during the reign of Süleyman of Germiyan.

See also
 Süleyman of Germiyan
 Yakup II of Germiyan

References

Sources

 (limited preview) 

1429 disestablishments
States and territories established in 1300
Anatolian beyliks
History of Kütahya
History of Kütahya Province
States and territories established by the Afshar tribe